Butyryl-coenzyme A (or butyryl-CoA) is the coenzyme A-containing derivative of butyric acid. It is acted upon by butyryl-CoA dehydrogenase and an intermediary compound of ABE fermentation.

Butyryl-CoA is a precursor to and converted from crotonyl-CoA. This interconversion is mediated by butyryl-COA dehydrogenase. FADH- is the hydride to crotonyl-CoA and FAD+ is the hydride acceptor. It is essential in reducing ferredoxins in anaerobic bacteria and archaea so that electron transport phosphorylation and substrate level phosphorylation can occur with increased efficiency.

From redox data, butyryl-COA dehydrogenase shows little to no activity at pH higher than 7.0. This is important as enzyme midpoint potential is at pH 7.0 and at 25 degrees C. Therefore, changes above from this value will denature the enzyme.

Within the human colon, butyrate helps supply energy to the gut epithelium and helps regulate cell responses.

Further reading

See also 
 Acyl-CoA
 Fatty acyl-CoA esters

References 

Thioesters of coenzyme A